Willowbrook Mall is a one-level shopping center with a partial second floor located in Wayne, New Jersey, United States. It is near the intersection of New Jersey Route 23, U.S. Route 46, and Interstate 80 in the New York metropolitan area and is situated close to both Essex and Morris counties near the Passaic River. 

As of 2022, the mall is anchored by Macy's, Bloomingdale's, Dave & Buster's, and Shopper's Find. The mall also features brands such as Apple, Banana Republic, Athleta, H&M, M.A.C., Sephora, and Zara. The mall also features dining options such as the previously mentioned Dave & Buster's, P. F. Chang's, Blaze Fast Fired Pizza, and The Cheesecake Factory.

The mall opened in 1969 and was expanded or renovated in 1970, 1988, 2006, and 2015. It is the fifth-largest shopping mall in New Jersey.

With blue laws in effect in neighboring Bergen County and Paramus, Willowbrook Mall has benefited from the spillover of shoppers on Sunday. The mall and its surrounding access roads and parking areas are prone to flooding in rainstorms. The Passaic River flows near the mall and one of its tributaries, the Pompton River, runs behind it.

History
Construction of Willowbrook Mall began in 1966 with the groundbreaking of a Bamberger's store. and by 1968 the construction included an Ohrbach's and a Sears. The mall was originally planned as a 110-store indoor shopping mall, encompassing . It opened on September 24, 1969. A second phase opened on August 12, 1970, consisting of 47 specialty stores on two floors, and a Stern's department store. Upon its opening, Willowbrook Mall become the largest enclosed shopping mall in the world.

In 1993, Willowbrook Mall became one of the first malls in New Jersey to ban smoking on mall grounds.
 The Bamberger's store has been open without interruption for the mall's entire existence, but was rebranded as Macy's in 1986 after its corporate parent decided to rebrand its entire northeastern United States operation under its namesake marque. Ohrbach's came under new ownership and was rebranded as part of the Steinbach chain, which went out of business in 1996. The building was gutted and expanded for its new tenant Lord & Taylor, which opened in 1997. Stern's closed its doors in 2001 after its parent company, Federated Department Stores, retired the brand; the store was converted to its sister brand, Bloomingdale's, which opened in late 2002.

In 2015, it was announced that the mall would undergo a two-year, $23 million renovation. The renovation entailed new ceilings in the Sears & Macy's wings, an overhaul of the food court, new flooring throughout the mall, additional seating, and a two-story streetscape theme for the Bloomingdale's wing.

Later that year, Sears Holdings spun off 235 of its properties, including the Sears at Willowbrook Mall, into a new company named Seritage Growth Properties. In 2017, Sears shrunk its square footage and subleased the unused portion to Dave & Buster's, which opened on Valentine's Day 2018. Seritage closed and demolished the Sears Auto Center for a Cinemark movie theater, becoming the second movie theater within the mall area limits (after a 14-screen AMC Theatres, formerly Loews Theatres). On July 15, 2019, Sears announced that it would be closing its store at the mall in mid-September 2019. The store shut down on September 15, 2019.

In August 2018, Macy's added a Macy's Backstage outlet in a portion of its store. A P.F Chang's opened within the Bloomingdale's store on January 22, 2019.

The Lord & Taylor location at the mall was closed on February 27, 2021 as part of the liquidation of the company, leaving Bloomingdale's and Macy's as the only traditional anchors. Later that year, a Shopper's Find opened in Lord & Taylor's former anchor location. 

In October 2020, it was announced that BJ's Wholesale Club would plan to open a warehouse store and gas station. The warehouse store would open in the former Sears, while the gas station would be north of the mall's parking lot.

Public transportation
The mall and its parking lots serve as a transportation hub for the surrounding area. A NJ Transit park and ride facility, opened in 1974, provides bus service to and from the Port Authority Bus Terminal in Midtown Manhattan. The  buses serve the mall.

In popular culture
Willowbrook Mall was the site of the Nickelodeon comedy The Adventures of Pete & Pete special episode "What We Did on Our Summer Vacation", in which Ellen's photo booth was located in the parking lot of the mall.

References

External links

 
 International Council of Shopping Centers: Willowbrook Mall

Shopping malls established in 1969
Shopping malls in New Jersey
Buildings and structures in Passaic County, New Jersey
Tourist attractions in Passaic County, New Jersey
Wayne, New Jersey
Shopping malls in the New York metropolitan area
1969 establishments in New Jersey
Brookfield Properties